Dead Poet Carried by a Centaur is a c. 1890 watercolour by Gustave Moreau, produced shortly after the death of Alexandrine Dureux and representing a reflection on the duality of man and the fate reserved for artists. It is now in the Musée Gustave Moreau, in Paris.

References

Bibliography 

 
 
 
 
 
 

Paintings by Gustave Moreau
1890s paintings
Collections of the Musée Gustave-Moreau
Watercolor paintings
Death in art